is a Japanese actress, model and tarento.

Nakamura is represented with Platinum Production.

Biography
Nakamura was born in Fukagawa, Koto, Tokyo. She graduated from Koto Ward Elementary School, Mejiro Gakuen Junior and Senior High School (now Mejiro Kenshin Junior and Senior High School) and Toyo Eiwa University. From her high school to college years Nakamura was part of the cheerleading team and served as the captain during her third year at high school, and participated in the national competition during both high school and college.

When she was a sophomore in college, she participated in a model audition from a form invited by her friend and won the Grand Prix. But Nakamura did not join the entertainment industry, and although she was finding employment during her third year in university she thought of entering the entertainment industry, she later entered to her current agent where she received an offer and made her debut.

While working as a model in fashion magazines and appearing in television programmes, she became a member of G Race in 2010 and served as a Super GT Image Girl, and in 2014 she also worked as an image model for keirin (cycle racing).

On 6 October 2015 Nakamura was awarded the "Sunglasses Department" award of the 28th Japan Megane Best Dresser Award.

According to a Lespas fitness awareness survey, she was chosen in first place of the women's ideal figure.

Works

Albums
G Race

Books

Filmography

TV programmes

TV drama

Films

Animated films

Radio

Advertising

Advertisements

Others

Awards

References

External links 

 

Japanese female models
Japanese television personalities
Japanese film actresses
Japanese television actresses
Japanese cheerleaders
People from Tokyo
1987 births
Living people
Models from Tokyo Metropolis
21st-century Japanese actresses